Geologorazvedka is a rural locality (a village) in Tashbulatovsky Selsoviet, Abzelilovsky District, Bashkortostan, Russia. The population was 350 as of 2010. There are 6 streets.

Geography 
Geologorazvedka is located 46 km north of Askarovo (the district's administrative centre) by road. Tashbulatovo is the nearest rural locality.

References 

Rural localities in Abzelilovsky District